Abderrahmane Mansouri (born 13 January 1995) is an Algerian racing cyclist, who rides for Emirati amateur team Yasi Cycling Team. In 2015 and 2016 he won the Algerian National Road Race Championships.

Major results

2012
 National Junior Road Championships
1st  Road race
1st  Time trial
 African Junior Road Championships
3rd  Time trial
7th Road race
2013
 National Junior Road Championships
1st  Road race
1st  Time trial
 African Junior Road Championships
2nd  Road race
3rd  Team time trial
4th Time trial
2014
 1st  Road race, Arab Road Championships
 4th Grand Prix d'Oran
 6th Critérium International de Sétif
 7th Overall Tour d'Algérie
 8th Overall Sharjah International Cycling Tour
 9th Overall Tour de Constantine
2015
 1st  Road race, National Road Championships
 African Games
2nd  Team time trial
10th Road race
 2nd Overall Tour International de Sétif
1st  Young rider classification
 2nd Circuit de Constantine
 3rd Overall Tour de Constantine
1st Stage 2
 4th Circuit d'Alger
 5th Overall Tour du Faso
1st  Young rider classification
 8th Overall Tour Internationale d'Oranie
2016
 National Road Championships
1st  Road race
1st  Under-23 road race
3rd Time trial
 1st Overall Tour de Tunisie
 2nd  Team time trial, African Road Championships
 3rd Overall Tour d'Annaba
1st  Young rider classification
 3rd Overall Tour du Sénégal
1st Young rider classification
1st Stage 1
 3rd Circuit de Constantine
 6th Critérium International de Sétif
 7th Overall Tour Internationale d'Oranie
 8th Overall Tour International de Sétif
2017
 1st  Team time trial, Arab Road Championships
 2nd  Team time trial, African Road Championships
 National Under-23 Road Championships
2nd Time trial
2nd Road race
 6th Overall Tour Meles Zenawi
2018
 2nd Overall Tour d'Algérie
 3rd  Team time trial, African Road Championships
 5th Overall Grand Prix International de la ville d'Alger
 7th Overall Tour International de la Wilaya d'Oran
2019
 National Road Championships
3rd Time trial
3rd Road race
 5th Trophée Princier, Challenge du Prince
2021
 3rd Road race, National Road Championships

References

External links
 
 

1995 births
Living people
Algerian male cyclists
Place of birth missing (living people)
Cyclists at the 2016 Summer Olympics
Olympic cyclists of Algeria
African Games silver medalists for Algeria
African Games medalists in cycling
Competitors at the 2015 African Games
Competitors at the 2018 Mediterranean Games
Mediterranean Games competitors for Algeria
21st-century Algerian people
20th-century Algerian people